Walter Keller was a Swiss sprinter. He competed in the men's 400 metres at the 1948 Summer Olympics.

References

External links
 

Year of birth missing
Possibly living people
Athletes (track and field) at the 1948 Summer Olympics
Swiss male sprinters
Olympic athletes of Switzerland
Place of birth missing